The Rosie Effect is a 2014 novel by Australian novelist Graeme Simsion and the second book of a trilogy including the previous instalment, The Rosie Project, and its sequel, The Rosie Result. The work was first published on 24 September 2014 in Australia / New Zealand by Text Publishing and the rights have since been sold in 24 other territories.  International sales are more than 1 million copies. In the United States the novel was published through Simon & Schuster and in the United Kingdom through Penguin Books. The novel centres on Don Tillman, a socially awkward genetics professor, and his preparation for fatherhood.

Synopsis
Don Tillman is an Australian genetics professor who probably has Asperger’s syndrome, though this is never stated explicitly.

In the prequel The Rosie Project, a romantic comedy novel, he met and married Rosie Jarman, a psychology PhD candidate at a university in Melbourne. The Rosie Effect is set in New York City, where Don and Rosie have moved. Don has taken up an associate professor position at Columbia University and Rosie has enrolled in a Doctor of Medicine degree while she concurrently completes the PhD. Early in the story, Rosie becomes pregnant, and Don's philandering mentor, Gene, who has left his wife Claudia, comes to live with them.

The book follows Don's attempts to prepare for parenthood and to support Rosie in her own preparation, drawing on science and the unreliable advice of his friends. Don's unconventional approach alienates Rosie and eventually leads to the breakdown of their marriage. Don pursues Rosie and persuades her to return.

Film adaptation
Sony Pictures optioned film rights to The Rosie Effect in September 2014. No plans for a sequel have been announced.

Reception
Critical reception for The Rosie Effect has been mostly positive and the book was a bestseller in multiple countries. NPR praised the book for not overly romanticizing Don, for achieving a tricky balance, and for its "classic Hitchcockian suspense". Bill Gates included The Rosie Effect as the only novel in his Top Five Books for 2014. The Sydney Morning Herald, which had praised The Rosie Project, published two reviews, one of which criticized the novel as "formulaic" while the second called it "a very funny book, possibly the funniest this year".

Awards 
 Indie Book Awards (Australia), Shortlisted, 2015
 Nielsen BookData Booksellers Choice Award, Shortlisted, 2015
 Australian Book Industry General Fiction Award, Shortlisted, 2015

References

External links
 

2014 Australian novels
Australian romance novels
Contemporary romance novels
Text Publishing books
Novels by Graeme Simsion